Norman "Norrie" Gillespie (born 20 April 1940) is a Scottish former footballer who played as a forward. He mostly played in the Scottish league, including appearances in the top flight of Scottish football for Falkirk in 1963. He has also appeared in the English football league with Wrexham. In 1965, he played abroad in the Eastern Canada Professional Soccer League with Toronto City.

References

1940 births
Living people
Arniston Rangers F.C. players
Arbroath F.C. players
Falkirk F.C. players
Wrexham A.F.C. players
Berwick Rangers F.C. players
Scottish footballers
Association football forwards
Footballers from Edinburgh
Toronto City players
Eastern Canada Professional Soccer League players